Dagmar Damková (born 29 December 1974) is a former Czech football referee, ex-chair of the FAČR referees committee, former member of the executive committee of the FAČR, ex-chair of the Steering Committee for Bohemia, ex-chair of the Czech Women's Football committee, member of the UEFA referees committee and member of the FIFA referees committee.

Early life
She graduated from the Faculty of Education at the University of West Bohemia with a degree in English language.

Career

She has been an international referee since 1999, her first match being Belarus against Moldova on 17 April 1999. She refereed the final at the 2008 Olympics, the final of the UEFA Women's Euro 2009 and the 2011 UEFA Women's Champions League Final. She is also the first woman to referee in the Czech First League.

Damková refereed three matches at the 2007 FIFA Women's World Cup in China, including the semi-final between Germany and Norway, becoming the first Czech woman to referee at such a level. She also refereed at the 2011 FIFA Women's World Cup in Germany.

Damková started refereeing in the Czech First League in the 2005–06 season. Following the match between Teplice and Slavia Prague on 27 November 2006, Damková had a 32-month break from the league after failing a fitness test, but returned in 2009. She refereed her last match in the Czech First League on 7 August 2011, taking charge of the match between Mladá Boleslav and Slovácko.

On 21 October 2020 Damková has resigned from the executive committee of the Czech Football Association and as chair of the Steering Committee for Bohemia. The move follows the resignation of her husband Roman Berbr, who was arrested in a scandal surrounding alleged match fixing.

Career statistics
Statistics for Czech First League matches only.

Personal life
Damková is married to former agent of the communist secret police StB, former Czech football referee and former vice-chairman of the FAČR Roman Berbr.

References

External links
Dagmar Damková at WorldReferee.com
Dagmar Damková at WorldFootball.net
Dagmar Damková at efotbal.cz 

1974 births
Living people
Czech football referees
Sportspeople from Plzeň
FIFA Women's World Cup referees
Olympic football referees
Czech women's footballers
Women association football referees
University of West Bohemia alumni
Women's association footballers not categorized by position